Ganesan Venkatasubramanian is an Indian psychiatrist and clinician-scientist who works as a professor of psychiatry at the National Institute of Mental Health and Neurosciences, Bangalore (NIMHANS). Venkatasubramanian is known for his studies in the fields of schizophrenia, transcranial Direct Current Stimulation (tDCS), brain imaging, neuroimmunology, neurometabolism and several other areas of biological psychiatry. The Council of Scientific and Industrial Research, the apex agency of the Government of India for scientific research, awarded him the Shanti Swarup Bhatnagar Prize for Science and Technology, one of the highest Indian science awards, for his contributions to medical sciences in 2018. He is also one of the collaborating scientists in the NIMHANS-IOB Bioinformatics and Proteomics laboratory of the Institute of Bioinformatics (IOB) in Bangalore and NIMHANS. Besides, he is an adjunct faculty at the Centre for Brain Research (CBR) in Bangalore.

Biography 
Ganesan Venkatasubramanian, born in the south Indian state of Tamil Nadu, graduated in medicine in 1998 from Stanley Medical College, completed his MD in Psychiatry in 2001 and PhD in Psychiatry (Schizophrenia) in 2013 from the National Institute of Mental Health and Neurosciences (NIMHANS). He did his clinical research studies under Professor B. N. Gangadhar and Professor M. S. Keshavan at NIMHANS. Later, he worked in University of Sheffield at the SCANLab as a clinical research fellow for training in advanced brain imaging techniques under Sean Spence, who pioneered the brain scan lie detector. On his return to India in 2004, he joined NIMHANS as an assistant professor of psychiatry and holds the position of  professor of psychiatry since 2016. At NIMHANS, he heads the Translational Psychiatry Laboratory (TransPsych Lab) as its principal investigator and hosts a number of researchers. He also serves as a consultant at the Schizophrenia Clinic and the Metabolic Clinic in Psychiatry of the institution.

Research and contributions 
Venkatasubramanian's research focus is in the fields of Schizophrenia, transcranial Direct Current Stimulation (tDCS), Brain imaging, Neuroimmunology, Neurometabolism, Clinical cognitive neuroscience and Psychopharmacology. He is known to have done extensive studies on 
evolutionary biology of human brain with respect to psychiatric disorders and exceptional skills and has published a number of articles, ResearchGate, an online repository of scientific articles has listed 371 of them. He is the Neuromodulation section editor of the Indian Journal of Psychological Medicine and serves as the associate editor of Asian Journal of Psychiatry published by Elsevier. He is also a member of the Indian Psychiatric Society and co-chaired its Biological Psychiatry section during 2010–11.

Awards and honors 
During his student days at Stanley Medical College (Chennai), Venkatasubramanian received several academic honors including Sankunni Marar Memorial Gold Medal in Physiology (1993), Maharaja of Cochin Prize in Physiology (1993), Kannusamy Memorial Prize in Pharmacology (1994), Professor Dr. Lalitha Kameswaran Prize for Pharmacology of The Tamil Nadu Dr. MGR Medical University (1994), Dr. S. S. Jain Memorial Gold Medal in Otorhinolaryngology (1995), Madras University Students' Club Endowment Prize in Forensic Medicine (1995), Dr. K. C. Paul's Prize in Clinical Surgery (1996) and Dr. K.C. Paul's Prize in Clinical Medicine (1996).  He received the Silver Jubilee Award for the Best Outgoing Resident Doctor of MD in Psychiatry at NIMHANS for the year 2001. The research paper awards received by him include Best Postgraduate Research Paper Award of Indian Psychiatric Society conference – Karnataka (2000), Dr. D. S. Raju Award of the Indian Psychiatric Society conference in Madurai (2000), Best Original Research Paper Award of the German Journal of Psychiatry (2002), Dr. S. S. Jayaram Award Indian Psychiatric Society, South Zone conference (2002), Bombay Psychiatric Society Silver Jubilee Award of the Indian Psychiatric Society – Hyderabad conference (2003), Bhagwat Award of the Indian Psychiatric Society conference (2007), Marfatia Award of the Indian Psychiatric Society - Kolkata conference (2008), Poona Psychiatrists Association Award 2009 and Poona Psychiatrists Association Award 2011.

Venkatasubramanian received the Young Scientist Award at the 12th Biennial International Winter Workshop on Schizophrenia in Davos, Switzerland in 2004 and the Scopus Young Scientist Award for Medicine of Elsevier in 2006. The National Academy of Sciences, India awarded him the Platinum Jubilee Young Scientist Award and he received the Innovative Young Biotechnologist Award of the Department of Biotechnology, both in 2008. The year 2009 brought him three awards, the Young Psychiatrist Award of the Indian Psychiatric Society, Shakuntala Amir Chand Prize of the ICMR and the Young Scientist Medal of the Indian National Science Academy, He is a co-recipient of the Aristotle Award in 2010 and Dr. Vidyasagar Award of the Indian Council of Medical Research in 2013. He is a recipient of the Senior Fellowship of Wellcome Trust and DBT India Alliance. He was awarded the SwarnaJayanti Fellowship in the field of life science (2014–15) by the Department of Science and Technology.  The Council of Scientific and Industrial Research awarded him the Shanti Swarup Bhatnagar Prize, one of the highest Indian science awards in 2018. He has also received the Tilak Venkoba Rao Oration Award by the Indian Psychiatric Society (2006), Professor M. Vaidyalingam Memorial Oration Award (2012) and the Best Poster Award at Neurobionics 2013 (Indo-German Workshop on Clinical Neurology).

Selected bibliography

See also 

 Mechanisms of schizophrenia
 Neuroimaging

Notes

References

External links 
 
 
 

Recipients of the Shanti Swarup Bhatnagar Award in Medical Science
Indian medical writers
Year of birth missing (living people)
Indian medical academics
Indian psychiatrists
Indian medical researchers
Alumni of the University of Sheffield
People from Tamil Nadu
Living people